Dannes is a commune in the Pas-de-Calais department in the Hauts-de-France region of France.

Geography
It is bordered on the western side by the English Channel.

Population

Places of interest
 The church of St. Martin, dating from the fifteenth century.

See also
Communes of the Pas-de-Calais department

References

Communes of Pas-de-Calais